The Speedway Grand Prix of Poland is a speedway event that is a part of the Speedway Grand Prix Series.

Winners

Most wins
 Tomasz Gollob 8 times 
 Bartosz Zmarzlik 8 times

References 

 
Grand Prix
 
Poland